Karikandi Union is a union parishad under Titas Upazila of Comilla District in the Chittagong Division of eastern Bangladesh.

References

Unions of Titas Upazila